Karen V. Hansen (born 1955) is an American author and professor of sociology and women's and gender studies at Brandeis University. Her books include Encounter on the Great Plains and Not-So-Nuclear Families.

Biography
Hansen was born in Chico, California, and received her BA from the University of California, Santa Barbara and her PhD from the University of California, Berkeley.

Scholarship
Hansen received fellowships from the John Simon Guggenheim Memorial Foundation, the National Endowment for the Humanities, and the Norwegian Royal Ministry of Foreign Affairs. Her previous books include A Very Social Time: Crafting Community in Antebellum New England (California, 1995), Not-So-Nuclear Families: Gender, Class, and Networks of Care (Rutgers, 2005), and several anthologies, including most recently, At the Heart of Work and Family: Engaging the Concepts of Arlie Hochschild (Rutgers, 2011).

Her latest book, Encounter on the Great Plains (Oxford University Press, 2013), comes after 15 years of research and writing, and a dozen trips to North Dakota. Her interest in the nexus of community and inequality is the starting point of this study of the Spirit Lake Dakota Indian Reservation in the early twentieth century. Scandinavian homesteaders took land on the reservation and became both the neighbors of Dakota Sioux and usurpers of their land. Encounter chronicles the processes that created ethnically mixed communities and mingled the separate and intertwining stories of Dakotas and immigrants—women and men, farmers, domestic servants, and day laborers—and their shared struggles to maintain a language, practice a culture, and honor loyalties to more than one nation. The project has received fellowship support from the John Simon Guggenheim Memorial Foundation and the National Endowment for the Humanities. Hansen is a visiting scholar at the Charles Warren Center for Studies in American History at Harvard University.

References

1955 births
Living people
American women writers
Brandeis University faculty